Boldly Going Nowhere was a proposed American science fiction single-camera comedy television series created by Rob McElhenney, Charlie Day, Glenn Howerton and Adam Stein to be aired in 2009 on the Fox network. The series was planned as a parody of the Star Trek franchise in the format of a workplace sitcom; the title was a reference to the famous phrase "To boldly go where no man has gone before" from the opening speech in the first two Star Trek series. A pilot was shot in 2008, but the project was shelved indefinitely.

Premise 
The show is a workplace comedy in a sci-fi setting dealing with the day-to-day adventures of the captain and crew of intergalactic rock-collecting spaceship RC-7, operating under the Galactic Coalition in the year 2189. Captain Ron Teague hopes to discover new worlds and civilizations instead of being a rock-collector. Unfortunately, he and his crew are immoral and incompetent people, and it is quickly apparent that they are all woefully delusional about the mundanity of their lives.

Development 
The initial concept for a comedy on a spaceship was pitched by Adam Stein, then a writers' assistant on It's Always Sunny in Philadelphia, to the Always Sunny co-creators, stars and showrunners Charlie Day, Glenn Howerton and Rob McElhenney in August 2007 when season 3 of the series was being edited. The three began to discuss it seriously during the 2007–08 writers' strike. After the strike ended, the trio brainstormed ideas with Stein and developed a script, with Day and McElhenney producing the first draft and all four receiving writing and co-creator credits. By March 2009, RCG Productions had signed a two-year deal with 20th Century Fox TV and received a pilot order based on their script, in addition to orders for scripts for five more episodes. Day, Howerton and McElhenney were signed on as executive producers, along with their manager Nick Frenkel and Michael Rotenberg from 3 Arts Entertainment.

The trio announced the upcoming project at SDCC 2008, while promoting season 4 of Sunny, and their plans to have the show on the air in 2009. They hoped to be heavily involved in the first season without playing any of the main roles, and to hire a showrunner to take over after the first six episodes so that they could continue to prioritize their FX show.

Ben Koldyke, who had written, directed and starred in the digital short Jedi Gym parodying Star Wars but was a relative unknown at the time, had approached RCG to get a writer-director position on Boldly Going Nowhere; instead he landed the lead role as the rogue captain and later went on to guest star in season 5 of Always Sunny while former Arrested Development actor Tony Hale was cast as his android companion. David Hornsby and Artemis Pebdani, who had both played recurring roles on It's Always Sunny in Philadelphia (Hornsby was also an executive producer) were cast as the captain's right-hand man and the alien communications officer respectively. Chad L. Coleman, best known at the time for his role as Dennis "Cutty" in The Wire, was cast as the chief of security and would go on to have a recurring role on Sunny starting in season 6. Oliver Platt was cast as Supervisor Bob Thompson in a cameo role.

A pilot was shot in October 2008 after post-production on season 4 of Always Sunny had been completed. The episode was directed by Wayne McClammy, and featured appearances by Always Sunny main cast members Kaitlin Olson and Howerton in guest roles as Tracy Brigsby, and the inspector, Lt Zander Centauri, respectively, while Day and McElhenney made brief cameos. By December 2008, it was reported that Fox was considering Boldly Going Nowhere and Glee most seriously among its slate of pilots for the following season because of positive responses to screenings.

However, in August 2009, Howerton revealed that the pilot was being rewritten, with Seinfeld writer Larry Charles now involved, to include more science fiction elements like aliens and world building for future episodes. The series underwent sporadic development over the next several years, but no further filming was done.

Cast 

 Ben Koldyke as Ronald Teague, the Captain of RC-7
 David Hornsby as Lieutenant Lance Brigsby, the captain's right-hand man whose wife Tracy cheats on him and brother-in-law Barry is a convicted felon
 Chad L. Coleman as Cobalt, the Chief of Security
 Lennon Parham as Joyce Beck, the pilot
 Tony Hale as Robot, the ship's intelligence android who's secretly plotting a robot uprising
 Artemis Pebdani as Startemis, the Killjovian communications officer
 Lenny Venito as Pete, the humanphibian mechanic in the engine room

Status
In May 2011, Howerton announced via his personal Twitter account that the show had been "shelved for now". In October 2013, McElhenney stated in a Reddit AMA that they were again working on the show.

In August 2022, two clips from the pilot were officially released to the public on The Always Sunny Podcast. In September 2022, the pilot episode was uploaded in its entirety to YouTube.

See also
 The Orville
 Avenue 5

References

External links 

 

It's Always Sunny in Philadelphia
Unaired television pilots
Parodies of Star Trek